Clara von Wille, née Clara Maria Alexandra von Böttcher (1838 in Düsseldorf – 15 March 1883, in Düsseldorf) was a German animal painter; associated with the Düsseldorf School.

Life and work
She was the youngest of four daughters born to the Royal Prussian Hussar, Major Carl Friedrich von Böttcher (1785–1857), and his wife Juliane Wilhelmine Charlotte von Buggenhagen (1797–1871). In 1859, she married the landscape and genre painter, August von Wille. Their son, Fritz, also became a well known landscape painter.

She was a private student of Karl Ferdinand Sohn and Ludwig Knaus. Later, she studied with the famous French animal painter, Rosa Bonheur.

Several of her works were purchased for a lottery, conducted by the Zentral-Dombau-Verein zu Köln, to raise money for completing the construction of Cologne Cathedral. Many of her most popular paintings were reproduced in illustrated magazines and as wood engravings.

References

Further reading 
 "Wille, Clara von". In: Friedrich von Boetticher: Malerwerke des 19. Jahrhunderts. Beitrag zur Kunstgeschichte. Vol.II-2, Dresden 1901.
 Alfons W. Biermann, Hubert Meyer: Die rheinische Landschaft im Bild. Die Malerfamilie von Wille. Exhibition catalog, Leopold-Hoesch-Museum, Düren 1976
 Margot Klütsch: Die Sammlung von Wille im Haus Beda Bitburg. Museum catalog, Bitburg 1992 
 Margot Klütsch: "Wille (geb. von Böttcher, von Boettcher), Clara (Klara) Maria Alexandra von". In: Hans Paffrath (Ed.): Lexikon der Düsseldorfer Malerschule 1819–1918. Vol.3: Nabert–Zwecker, F. Bruckmann, Munich 1998, pg.427

External links 

 Clara von Wille documents @ Kalliope Verbund

1838 births
1883 deaths
19th-century German painters
German women painters
German painters of animals
Artists from Düsseldorf
Düsseldorf school of painting